Philip Morgan may refer to:

Philip D. Morgan (born 1949), American historian
Philip H. Morgan (1825–1900), American jurist
Philip Morgan (bishop) (died 1435), Bishop of Worcester and Bishop of Ely and unsuccessful candidate for Archbishop of York
Phil Morgan (rugby league), Welsh rugby league footballer of the 1960s and 1970s
S. Philip Morgan (born 1953), professor of sociology
Phil Morgan (footballer) (born 1974), English football goalkeeper
Philip Morgan (cricketer) (1927–2017), English sportsman, clergyman and educator